Diego Mauricio Toro Arcila (born January 29, 1982) is a Colombian footballer.

Club career
Born in Medellín, Antioquia, Toro began playing professionally as a defensive midfielder with Atlético Nacional in 2000. He has also played as a central defender for Categoría Primera A sides Deportivo Pereira, Deportivo Pasto and Real Cartagena. After six months out of contract, he debuted in the second division with Envigado in September 2011. Toro had a brief spell in the Chinese Super League with Beijing Guoan, and signed with Patriotas in 2012.

International career
He has been capped for the Colombian sub 17 and sub 20 teams, and was also a member of the Pre Selección Sub 23 Pre Olímpica.

References

1982 births
Living people
Footballers from Medellín
Colombian footballers
Atlético Nacional footballers
Deportivo Pasto footballers
Deportivo Pereira footballers
Real Cartagena footballers
Envigado F.C. players
Beijing Guoan F.C. players
Patriotas Boyacá footballers
Colombian expatriate footballers
Expatriate footballers in China
Association football midfielders